Bentleigh East is a suburb in Melbourne, Victoria, Australia,  south-east of Melbourne's Central Business District, located within the City of Glen Eira local government area. Bentleigh East recorded a population of 30,159 at the 2021 census.

History

The suburb, like its neighbour Bentleigh, was named after the infamous Victorian politician Thomas Bent. Part of East Bentleigh was inside the original grant of land bought by English farmer and brewer, Henry Dendy, in 1841. He bought  which was bounded on the west by Port Phillip Bay, then North Road, East Boundary Road and South Road.

East Bentleigh police station closed in the early 1990s and the building remains standing on the corner of East Boundary Road and Omeo Court, near Centre Road (opposite the hotel).

The East Village urban renewal plan (for the 25-hectare industrial/commercial site on the corner of East Boundary Road and North Road) will transition the site into a bustling hub of innovative jobs (some existing Virginia park businesses will remain), diverse housing, schools, shopping/dining and open space.

Population

In the 2016 census, there were 27,635 people in Bentleigh East. 62.5% of people were born in Australia.

Geography

Larger than its namesake Bentleigh (and featuring a completely unrelated postcode), East Bentleigh is 14 km south-east from Melbourne's Central Business District. Its boundaries form a square shape, which is to the west by Tucker Road, to the north by North Road, to the east by Warrigal Road and to the south by South Road. It is bisected by Centre Road east-west and East Boundary Road north-south. The area around Mackie Road is the locality of Coatesville. East Bentleigh generally enjoys smooth road surfaces.

Features

Since opening in 1975, the 147-bed Moorabbin Hospital, part of Monash Health, has become one of Victoria's leading medical and research facilities, building a tradition of high quality care to its community. It is home to the Monash Cancer Centre and other health care services in addition to Victoria's first Simulation Centre, which plays a major role in the education and training of undergraduate and postgraduate medical students, nurses and allied health professionals.

Education

Government primary schools within Bentleigh East include Valkstone Primary School, Coatesville Primary School, Tucker Road Primary School and East Bentleigh Primary School.

McKinnon Secondary College (New Campus), at the Virginia Park site, is the school's Year 8/9 campus, with some Year 7 programs. It will take its first students in 2022.

Government schools closed by the Kennett Government during the 1990s included East Bentleigh Primary School (in Centre Road), Eastmoor Primary School and Moorleigh High School (now Moorleigh Village).

St Bede's College (formerly St James College) is a Catholic boys high school.

Parks and Recreation

Bailey Reserve (East Boundary Road) features Glen Eira's only skate park, a playground, picnic/BBQ facilities, a golf cage, cricket nets, fitness stations, sporting fields (cricket, soccer, softball) and GSAC. It is home to East Bentleigh Soccer Club and Glen Eira Moorabbin Softball Association. Glen Eira Sports and Aquatic Centre (GESAC), owned by Glen Eira Council and opened in 2012 on the former site of East Bentleigh Swim Centre, is home to a 50m outdoor pool, 25m indoor pool, leisure pools and water slides, a spa and sauna/steam room, full-service gymnasium and sports stadium. Basketball, netball, soccer and athletics teams have their home-base here. The Bailey Reserve Scout Group hall is at the southern border of the reserve.

Gum tree fringed Centenary Park (Bignell Road) is a sprawling open space featuring sports grounds, running tracks, fitness stations, cricket nets and a golf cage, playgrounds and BBQ/picnic amenities. It is home to St Peters Football Club, Bentleigh Uniting Cricket Club and Centenary Park Tennis Club.

King George VI Memorial Reserve opens into large recreation space off East Boundary Road and features cricket and football grounds, a half basketball court, tennis hit wall, playground and BBQ/picnic facilities. It is home to Bentleigh Junior Football Club, Bentleigh ANA Cricket Club, East Bentleigh Central Cricket Club and Kings Park Tennis Club.

Marlborough Street Reserve features lovely open space, a playground with BBQ facilities and sports grounds (soccer). It is home to East Bentleigh Soccer Club.

Other parks with playgrounds include Dega Avenue Park, Colin Street Reserve (Colin Street), Wingate and Brady Roads Reserve and Pell Street Reserve.

Golfers play at the course of The Yarra Yarra Golf Club on Warrigal Road.

Notable People

Arts 
Paul Grabowski [AO] is a distinguished Australian pianist, composer and producer and established a reputation as one of Australia's leading jazz musicians. He has won seven ARIA awards, written scores for many Australian films and television series, and performed and recorded both solo and in collaboration with artists including Paul Kelly, Kate Ceberano and Vince Jones.

Artist Rory Lynch-Wells, best known for his large-scale colourful walls and public murals (e.g. Ben Simmons, Chapel St, Windsor) which have become tourist attractions, lived in the suburb.

Visual artist and toy-maker Sarah Gully lives in the suburb.

Science
Dr Joanna Newton [OAM] was awarded for her service to agriculture through scientific research (in genetics for the dairy industry). In 2017 she won the Dairy Research Foundation's Emerging Scientists Award and in 2018 won the Leadership category in the Victorian Young Achiever Awards, received the University of New England's Young Distinguished Alumni Award and was included in the Australian Financial Review's "100 Women of Influence" List.

Keith Osborne Collett [AM], was honoured for his significant service to sustainable land management practices and water conservation.

Other
Sir Thomas Bent KCMG (7 December 1838 – 17 September 1909) was an Australian politician and the 22nd Premier of Victoria and developed the suburb of Bentleigh, which was named after him.

Maureen Frances Bugden [OAM] was awarded for service to veterans and their families through a range of volunteer roles.

Ian Macfarlane, Australia's Reserve Bank governor (1996–2006), economist, company director and writer (Ten Remarkable Australians) was raised in Bentleigh East.

Norman "Norm“ William Maddock [OAM], ANZAC Battle of Crete veteran, was awarded for service to the Victorian tramways, particularly through the Malvern Tramways Museum and as a union official.

See also
 City of Moorabbin – Bentleigh East was previously within this former local government area.

References

External links
Australian Places – Bentleigh & Bentleigh East

Suburbs of Melbourne
Suburbs of the City of Glen Eira